Natasha Cockram is a Welsh marathon runner.

Early life 
Cockram is from Cwmbran, Wales.

She attended the University of Tulsa in Oklahoma, United States from 2012 to 2015, competing in cross country. She was accepted into the medical school at the University of South Carolina, but declined the place to focus on running.

Running 
In 2018, Cockram came first in the women's category of the inaugural 2018 Newport Marathon with a time of 02:44:58.

In 2019, Cockram finished fifth in the Dublin Marathon, setting a new Welsh women's record with a time of 02:30:50. The previous record was held by Susan Tooby with a time of 02:31:33 at the 1988 Summer Olympics. This was despite a horse kicking her on the eve of the race.

Cockram finished 13th in the 2020 London Marathon, with a time of 02:33:19, 3 minutes and 49 seconds outside of the qualifying time for the Olympic Games. She was the top finishing Briton at the race. She came second at the 2020 Olympics marathon trial, slower than the Olympic qualifying time. In June 2021, UK Athletics published its list of athletes for the delayed 2020 Summer Olympics, and Cockram was not selected.

In 2021, Cockram won the Norwich Half Marathon, with a time of 01:16:31. She won the Los Angeles Marathon on 7 November 2021, with a time of 02:33:17.

In December 2022 Cockram lowered her Welsh record to 2:26:14 at the Valencia Marathon, placing her sixth on the all-time British list.

Personal life 
In 2020, Cockram moved to Norfolk, England.

References 

1992 births
Living people
Welsh female long-distance runners
Welsh female marathon runners
Tulsa Golden Hurricane women's track and field athletes